Jiang Kun (born November 19, 1950) is a Chinese comedian, specializing in the xiangsheng trade. Jiang Kun currently acts as deputy chairman of the Association of Chinese Folk Art.

Biography
Jiang was born in Beijing, on 19 October 1950. His grandfather Jiang Zongli was born in Yantai, Shandong. In order to escape famine, he came to Beijing and set up a steamed bread shop. Later he opened a restaurant called "Tong Fu Zhai". Jiang's father Jiang Zuyu (1924–1989) was a calligrapher, he studied calligraphy under Zhang Boying and Hua Shikui. Jiang Kun has two uncles and one sister, Jiang Zuming, Jiang Zuyuan and Jiang Shuzhen.

In 1976, he was transferred to the Central Radio Broadcasting Backstage Rap Group, whilst studying under Ma Ji. In 1985, Jiang Kun was elected Vice-Chairman of the Chinese Ballad Singers Association. In the same year, he replaced his mentor Ma Ji, and took on the duties as the Head of the China Radio Broadcasting Rap Group, and was also elected a member of the Standing Committee of the China Youth Federation. In recent years, Kun has been a regular performer on prominent events such as the CCTV New Year's Gala, the largest annual television event in the world (by viewership).

Personal life
Jiang married Li Jingmin, the couple has a daughter named Jiang Shan (born 1979).

Famous works
 "Drunken"
 "Injections"
 "Anxious"
 "Learning to sing"
 "Elevators Adventure"
 "Poetry and Love"
 "So Camera"
 "I am a little dizzy"
 "Big News"
 "Best Network"

Awards
On February 11, 2007, Jiang Kun was awarded the World Outstanding Chinese Award.

Filmography
He has starred in the 2008 Chinese documentary, "" (loosely translated as The World Shook in 7 Days).
The Galaxy on Earth (2014)

References

1950 births
Living people
Chinese xiangsheng performers
Chinese male comedians
Chinese male voice actors